Bolibompa is a Swedish children's television series produced by Sveriges Television (SVT). It first aired in 1987 and SVT continues to regularly produce Bolibompa related content . Each episode consists of several short segments presented by one or occasionally several of the series hosts. At the end of each segment the host presents another children's program. After the episode ends Bolibompa returns with another, usually live, segment. The main Bolibompa series which had been airing most evenings since 1987 got taken out of production at the end of 2022 but the Bolibompa name and its mascot will continue to be used for other television programming.

1987-2014

Bolibompa has undergone major changes since 1987, but the core concept as a frame for other content was kept for several decades. Until 1990 it was only presenting other programs without dedicated hosts or original content. In 2005 Bolibompa started broadcasting in the mornings on top of the usual 18:00-19:00 slot.

2015-Present
The show underwent major changes in January 2015. The production moved away from the old set to a new one featuring the Bolibompa dragon's house. The dragon itself is getting more emphasize. The goal of these changes was to appeal to pre-schoolers. The evening broadcast is shortened to 30 minutes and the morning broadcast, which used to go under the name Bolibompa as well was renamed to Morgonshowen (the morning show).

Morgonshowen consisted, just like Bolibompa, of other children's programmes interspersed with short segments from the host. These segments included a daily dressing race and toothbrushing, the intention being that children would follow along before school or pre-school. In 2019 Morgonshowen stopped broadcasting with the same children's programs being broadcast at the same time without Morgonshowen as a frame. SVT cited decreasing viewer figures and most children watching their content digitally as reasons for the change.

To differentiate the show previously known as just Bolibompa it was renamed  ("The dragon's garden").  was produced until 2017 after which it has been doing reruns. As a replacement came  ("The dragon's hotel") where the dragon started to talk. In 2021 a new short lived concept was introduced,  ("The Bolibompa club"). It was a show where the dragon interacts with children both in person and through video chat, recordings, sent in drawings and more. Bolibompaklubben was cancelled at the end of 2022 bringing the main evening segment to an end.

References

Swedish children's television series
Sveriges Television original programming
1987 Swedish television series debuts
1980s Swedish television series
1990s Swedish television series
2000s Swedish television series
2010s Swedish television series
2020s Swedish television series